Cooke Rugby Football Club, which was founded in 1910, is the oldest junior rugby club in Belfast, Northern Ireland. They currently field 3 Senior Men's teams, the 1st XV playing in Qualifying 1, and a successful Women's team, which competes in the Women's All-Ireland League.

It owes its origins to the members of a Bible class in the Cooke Centenary Presbyterian Church in the Ballynafeigh area. It was originally based at Upper Galwally until 1991 and the first clubhouse was a small black wooden hut.

Cooke had a cricket club which merged with elements within the cricket section of Belfast Harlequins associated with the former Collegians Cricket Club in 1998 and plays as Cooke Collegians.

Honours

Rugby
Ulster Junior Cup: 2
 1986-87, 2006–07

References

External reference 

Sources: Belfast Newsletter, The Belfast Telegraph.

Cooke Rugby Club

Sports clubs in Belfast
Field hockey clubs in Northern Ireland
Rugby union clubs in Northern Ireland
Irish rugby union teams
1910 establishments in Ireland
Rugby union clubs in County Antrim